The Seoul Lantern Festival is a festival held every November in Seoul in South Korea when hundreds of lanterns decorate the public recreation space of Cheonggyecheon.

Introduction
The Seoul Lantern Festival started in 2009. The two-week festival starts on the Friday of the first week in November and covers downtown Seoul in sparkling lights, illuminating the city at night during the early winter. Visitors can encounter various types of lanterns from Cheonggye Plaza to Supyo Bridge (1.2 kilometers).

Program 
Seoul Lantern Festival offers different concepts of festival every year.

2009 

The first Seoul Lantern Festival celebrated the 'Visit Korea Year 2010 to 2012' for 5 days. The festival had four themes that were related to 'ryu' Korean.  
 Theme 1: Gyoryu zone (Exchange zone)  
 Theme 2: Wonryu zone (Headwaters zone)  
 Theme 3: Hanryu zone (Korean wave zone) 
 Theme 4: Ilryu zone (First-class zone)

2010 
The second Seoul Lantern Festival  drew 2.3 million visitors, including about 370,000 foreign tourists. The festival's paper lanterns were from 24 countries including Korea, Japan, China, Taiwan, the Philippines, Hong Kong, Singapore, New Zealand and Malaysia. The festival was originally planned for 10 days, but public pressure, largely from the foreign tourists, convinced the organisers to extend the festival by seven additional days. 
 Theme : Seoul, the forest of the glimmer of hope.

2011 

The main theme of the 2011 festival was 'The History of Seoul by Lanterns' (alternately, '…Told with Light'; literally 'An Old Story of Seoul with Lantern'). Lantern art was used to tell the history of Korea from the Joseon Dynasty through modern times, with special attention to the stories told for Children.
 Theme 1: History of Korea
 Theme 2: Memory of the childhood
 Theme 3: Characters for children

2012 

'The Roots of Seoul, the Life of Ancestors'. was the theme for 2012, once again running a total of 17 days with lanterns illuminated from 5:00 PM to 11:00 PM.
 Theme 1: Fortress Wall of Seoul 
 Theme 2: The story of ancestors who lead Joseon about 200 years
 Theme 3: Life of the people of Joseon
 Theme 4: Opened Seoul

2013 

This fifth Seoul Lantern Festival opened on 1 November to 11 November with a main theme of 'Millennial dream of Hanseong Baekje'. During this festival, visitors could make hanji lanterns, watch musical performances and enjoy other entertainments  and events along Cheonggye Plaza and other Seoul sites. A modern lantern in the form of a falcon symbolized the lionhearted Baekje,  one of the Three Kingdoms of Korea, and an opening musical performance and parade was based on the life of Geunchogo of Baekje who oversaw the apex of that kingdom.

 Theme 1: 500 years of Hanseong Baekje
 Theme 2: Woongjin(Gongju) Baekje Period
 Theme 3: Buyeo Baekje Period
 Theme 4: The harmony, spirit of Baekje

2014 

The Seoul Lantern Festival changed its Korean name in 2014 to the Seoul Bitchorong Festival, but there was no change to the name in English. According to the organizing committee, it has changed the Korean name because the festival has expanded to be a combination of traditional lanterns and modern lights like LEDs. It has opened from Cheonggye Plaza to Supyogyo(Bridge) about 1.2 km and displayed about 30,000 light bulbs and about 300 lanterns of 58 lantern light arts. Moreover, the wish tree that is displayed at Kwangtong Bridge was 8 m high and it contained the wishes of Seoul citizens and foreign visitors. As a result, about 3.14 million visitors enjoyed the Seoul Lantern Festival 2014. The total visitors rate has increased 25% from the year before. The largest number of visitors enjoyed the Seoul Lantern Festival 2014.

Total foreign visitors are about 630,000 and this rate has increased 16% from the year before.
 Theme 1: Wonderful world heritage of Seoul
 Theme 2: Invitation from local government and foreign country
 Theme 3: Famous characters
 Theme 4: Light Arts

2015  

 Theme 1: Amazing World heritage in Seoul  
 Theme 2: From local governments and overseas invitation  
 Theme 3: Corporation and the character  
 Theme 4: Light Art author show

Location

By subway 
 Line 1 and 2 City Hall Station, exit 1 
 Line 5 Line 5 Gwanghwamun Station, exit 5 
 Line 1 Jonggak Station, exit 4 and 5 
 Line 2 Euljiro 1(il)-ga Station, exit 2 and 3 
 Line 2 Euljiro 3(sam)-ga Station, exit 1, 2, 4, and 5

Criticism 
The Seoul Lantern Festival was organized just in time to celebrate the 'Visit Korea Year 2010 to 2012'. It was decided to hold the Seoul Lantern Festival annually, and in response the city of Jinju criticized the festival severely. They said that the Seoul Lantern Festival was a copy of their Jinju Namgang Yudeng Festival, which itself is annual and had begun earlier, in 2000. It had been started in that year as a public requiem, and also as an occasion for a Korean prayer rite in honour of about 70,000 soldiers and civilians who had died in the historic second battle at Jinju Castle in 1593. More than 20 Jinju associations asked for the Seoul Lantern Festival to be discontinued. There was a one-man protest in front of the Seoul city hall and an assembly at the Seoul station. As a result, the city of Seoul and the city of Jinju agreed to change the Korean name of the Seoul Lantern Festival, and thus differentiated the Seoul Lantern Festival from the Jinju Namgang Yudeng Festival.

References

External links
 
(facebook)

Lantern shows
Festivals in Seoul
Annual events in South Korea
2009 establishments in South Korea
Recurring events established in 2009
Autumn events in South Korea